Got to Find a Way is a studio album by Curtis Mayfield, released in 1974 under Curtom Records.  It peaked at number 76 on the Billboard 200 chart, as well as number 17 on the Top R&B/Hip-Hop Albums chart.

Track listing

Personnel
Credits adapted from liner notes.
Joseph "Lucky" Scott - bass
Rich Tufo - organ, keyboards, arrangements
Quentin Joseph - drums
Henry Gibson - congas
Curtis Mayfield - all vocals, second guitar, production
Gary Thompson - lead guitar
Technical
 Roger Anfinsen – engineering
 Milton Sincoff – creative packaging design
 William S. Harvey – cover design, painting
 Marv Stuart – management

Charts

References

External links
 

1974 albums
Curtis Mayfield albums
Albums produced by Curtis Mayfield
Curtom Records albums